Aggrey is both a surname and a given name. The term means powerful and complete. Notable people with the name include:

Surname 
 James Aggrey (1875–1927), Ghanaian missionary and teacher
 Jimmy Aggrey (born 1978), English professional football player
 Orison Rudolph Aggrey (1926–2016), U.S. diplomat

Given name 
 Aggrey Awori (1939–2021), Kenyan politician
 Aggrey Bagiire, Ugandan politician
 Aggrey Burke (born 1943), British psychiatrist and academic, born in Jamaica
 Aggrey Chiyangi (born 1964), Zambian football player 
 Aggrey Jaden , South Sudanese politician
 Aggrey Klaaste (1940–2004), South African journalist
 Aggrey Morris (born 1984), Tanzanian footballer
 Aggrey D Sallah (born 1999, SIHA Kilimanjaro), Young Tanzanian politician

See also 
Aggrey beads, Ghanaian bead handicraft
Aggrey House, a hostel in London
Aggrey Road, a street in Port Harcourt, Nigeria

References

Feminine given names
Masculine given names